Thomas Hayne was a theologian.

Thomas Hayne or Haine may also refer to:

Thomas Hayne (MP) for Chichester
Thomas Hayne, character in Actor's and Sin
Tom Haine (1933–1994), member of the Volleyball Hall of Fame

See also
Thomas Haynes (disambiguation)